WGSB may refer to:

Wilmington Grammar School for Boys
Wirral Grammar School for Boys
Watford Grammar School for Boys, more commonly abbreviated to WBGS
WGSB (AM), a defunct radio station (1060 AM) formerly licensed to serve Mebane, North Carolina, United States